Muse Watson (born July 20, 1948) is an American stage and screen actor. He became known for his roles as Ben Willis, the primary antagonist in the I Know What You Did Last Summer franchise, Charles Westmoreland on the Fox television series Prison Break and Mike Franks in CBS television series NCIS.

Early life
Watson was born on July 20, 1948, in Alexandria, Louisiana. He attended Louisiana Tech on a music stipend for two years before transferring to Berea College in Berea, Kentucky, where he performed for the first time on stage as Petruchio in a production of Shakespeare's The Taming of the Shrew. During and after his years at Berea, he worked in outdoor dramas, dinner theaters, and small repertory groups.

Career
His theater credits include acting as Hamlet in Hamlet, Stanley in A Streetcar Named Desire, Pale in Burn This, and Cervantes in Man of La Mancha. He also directed a production of Ain't Misbehavin'.

In 1989, with a new transition to film, Watson began pursuing feature film roles. By 2005, he had appeared in 43 feature films such as Sommersby, Something to Talk About, Assassins, Dead Birds, Rosewood, I Know What You Did Last Summer, From Dusk Till Dawn 2, I Still Know What You Did Last Summer, Austin Powers: The Spy Who Shagged Me, and Songcatcher. As of 2005, seven of the films he has appeared in, combined, have grossed over $850 million.

His television credits include eight made-for-television movies including Blind Vengeance and Justice in a Small Town; and the television series, American Gothic, The Young Indiana Jones Chronicles, Cold Case, Matlock, The Lazarus Man, JAG, Walker, Texas Ranger, Criminal Minds, and Prison Break. He appeared on episodes of Ghost Whisperer ("Delia's First Ghost", April 2007), which reunited him with his I Know What You Did Last Summer co-star Jennifer Love Hewitt, and CSI ("Who and What", November 2007). Watson also guest starred in an episode of The Mentalist ("Carnelian, Inc.", March 2009), and in the Castle episode "Punked" (October 2010).  Since 2006, he has appeared as a recurring cast member on NCIS as Agent Leroy Jethro Gibbs's mentor and former superior Mike Franks.

Watson also gave a performance with Jennifer Love Hewitt as a special guest on Saturday Night Live (1998), parodying his role in I Know What You Did Last Summer. He also joined the production company Shorris Film with Christopher Showerman and Clint Morris—their first film is the Western Between the Sand and the Sky. In 2010, Watson filmed A Christmas Snow, in which he played a character named Sam.

Watson is an advocate for people with autism, and has taken an active role in educating people about autism. He is the honorary chairman of Stars for Autism, a nonprofit organization incorporated in Battlefield, Missouri. He is featured in the video promotion for that organization, www.Stars4Autism.com.

He wrote the foreword to a book for parents and teachers, entitled Stars in Her Eyes, Navigating the Maze of Childhood Autism, by Dr. Linda Barboa and Elizabeth Obrey.

Filmography

Film

Television

References

https://en.wikipedia.org/wiki/Autism_Info-Blast

External links
 
 
 

 Stars in Her Eyes: Navigating the Maze of Childhood Autism, 2014, L.Barboa and E. Obrey, Tate Publishing.

1948 births
American male film actors
American male stage actors
American male television actors
People from Alexandria, Louisiana
Louisiana Tech University alumni
Berea College alumni
Male actors from Louisiana
20th-century American male actors
21st-century American male actors
Living people